A sermon is an oration by a prophet or member of the clergy.

Sermon may also refer to:

People
Sermon (ruler), 11th-century ruler of Srem, vassal of Samuil of Bulgaria
Erick Sermon (born 1968), American hip hop musician and record producer
François Sermon (1923–2013), Belgian footballer
Paul Sermon (born 1966), Professor of Creative Technologies at Salford University, England
R. R. Sermon (Raymond Rollins Sermon; 1893–1965), American college football and basketball player and coach
Trey Sermon (Born 1999), American football player
Wayne Sermon (born 1984), American rock musician and record producer, lead guitarist for the pop rock band Imagine Dragons
Brandon Sermons (born 1991), American football player

Music
The Sermon (Jimmy Smith album), 1959 jazz album by Jimmy Smith
The Sermon (Hampton Hawes album) 1987 album of 1958 tapes
 "A Sermon", a song by The Police
 "Sermon", a song by Drowning Pool from Sinner
 "Sermon", a song by James Arthur from Back from the Edge
 The Sermon (band), a rock band from Syracuse, New York

Other
"The Sermon", story by Haim Hazaz
"The Sermon", 1975, Season 4 Episode 1 of The Waltons